Sayyid Zayn al-Abidin Junabadi was an Iranian bureaucrat, active in the diwan under the Timurid rulers Timur and Shah Rukh. A member of the provincial elite, he was a landlord in his native town of Junabad in Quhistan. He died in 1425/6; he was survived by his son Imad al-Din Mahmud Junabadi, who also served in the diwan.

References

Sources 
 
 
 

Officials of the Timurid Empire
14th-century Iranian people
15th-century Iranian people
14th-century births
1420s deaths
Year of birth unknown
Year of death uncertain

People from Razavi Khorasan Province